Wagner Rocha (born 17 January 1969) is a Brazilian volleyball player. He competed in the men's tournament at the 1988 Summer Olympics.

References

1969 births
Living people
Brazilian men's volleyball players
Olympic volleyball players of Brazil
Volleyball players at the 1988 Summer Olympics
Sportspeople from São Paulo